Taxi Aéreos de El Salvador or TAES is a Salvadoran airline that operates domestic flights within El Salvador.
Taes operates with a fleet of Piper PA-31 Navajos and Piper PA-23 Aztecs. TAES provides flights from San Miguel Airstrip to Ilopango Airport and Comalapa International Airport.

References

Defunct airlines of El Salvador
Airlines established in 1988
Airlines disestablished in 1994